Mexican hip hop is hip hop music from Mexico or hip hop music performed by Mexican artists or artists of Mexican descent.

Narco-rap
Narco rap is a subgenre of Mexican rap. It is influenced by narcocorridos.

See also
 Chicano rap

References

 
Latin hip hop
Hip hop